"As Long as It Matters" is a song by American power pop band Gin Blossoms. It was released in July 1996 via A&M Records as the third single from their third studio album, Congratulations I'm Sorry (1996). The song was written by Phillip Rhodes, Jesse Valenzuela, and Robin Wilson and produced by John Hampton and the band.

Commercially, "As Long as It Matters" became a moderate hit in the United States and Canada, reaching number 75 on the US Billboard Hot 100 and number 10 on the Canadian RPM Top Singles chart. In 1997 the song was nominated for a Grammy Award for Best Pop Performance by a Duo or Group with Vocals in 1997.

Track listing

Charts

References

External links
 
 
 
 

Gin Blossoms songs
1996 singles
1996 songs
A&M Records singles
Songs written by Robin Wilson (musician)
Songs written by Jesse Valenzuela